Frederick Neil Sturt (born January 6, 1951) is a former American football guard in the National Football League for the Washington Redskins, the New England Patriots, and the New Orleans Saints.  He played college football at Bowling Green State University and was Drafted in the third round of the 1973 NFL Draft by the St. Louis Cardinals.

Sturt currently sells pre-owned vehicles at Yark Auto in Toledo, Ohio.

References

1951 births
Living people
Sportspeople from Toledo, Ohio
American football offensive guards
Bowling Green Falcons football players
Washington Redskins players
New England Patriots players
New Orleans Saints players